The 107th district of the Texas House of Representatives consists of portions of east Dallas, Mesquite, and south Garland in Dallas County. The current Representative is Victoria Neave, who has represented the district since 2017.

References 

107